Goodenia occidentalis, commonly known as western goodenia, is a species of flowering plant in the family Goodeniaceae and is endemic to drier parts of southern Australia. It is a short-lived prostrate to low-lying herb with scaly, lance-shaped leaves and racemes of yellow flowers with a brownish centre.

Description
Flowering mainly occurs from June to September and the fruit is a more or less spherical capsule  in diameter.

Taxonomy and naming
Goodenia occidentalis was first formally described in 1980 by Roger Charles Carolin in the journal Telopea from material he collected on the road between Warburton, Western Australia and Laverton in 1967. The specific epithet (occidentalis) refers to the species' mainly western distribution, although it has been found as far east as New South Wales.

Distribution and habitat
This goodenia grows on sand dunes and stony hills and is widely distributed in the drier areas of Western Australia, the Northern Territory and South Australia. It has also been recorded from near Louth in New South Wales.

Conservation status
Goodenia occidentalis is classified as "not threatened" by the Government of Western Australia Department of Parks and Wildlife but as of "near threatened" under the Northern Territory Government Territory Parks and Wildlife Conservation Act 1976 and as "endangered" under the New South Wales Biodiversity Conservation Act 2016.

References

occidentalis
Eudicots of Western Australia
Flora of the Northern Territory
Flora of South Australia
Flora of New South Wales
Plants described in 1980
Taxa named by Roger Charles Carolin
Endemic flora of Australia